The 39th FIE Fencing World Cup began in October 2009 and concluded in November 2010 at the 2010 World Fencing Championships held in Paris.

Individual Épée

Individual Foil

Individual Sabre

Team Épée

Team Foil

Team Sabre

References 
 FIE rankings

Fencing World Cup
2009 in fencing
2010 in fencing
International fencing competitions hosted by France
2010 in French sport